ilastik  is a user-friendly free open source software for image classification and segmentation. No previous experience in image processing is required to run the software.

Features
ilastik allows user to annotate an arbitrary number of classes in images with a mouse interface. Using these user annotations and the generic (nonlinear) image features, the user can train a random forest classifier. ilastik has a CellProfiler module to use ilastik classifiers to process images within a CellProfiler framework.

History
ilastik was first released in 2011 by scientists at the Heidelberg Collaboratory for Image Processing (HCI), University of Heidelberg.

Application
 The Interactive Learning and Segmentation Toolkit
 Carving  
 Cell classification and neuron classification 
 Synapse detection
 Cell tracking

Resources
ilastik project is hosted on GitHub. It is a collaborative project, any contributions such as comments, bug reports, bug fixes or code contributions are welcome.

References

External links

 
 

Image segmentation
Computer vision software
Data mining and machine learning software
Free software programmed in Python